Jānis Podžus (born 29 June 1994) is a Latvian tennis player.

Podžus has a career high ATP singles ranking of 675 achieved on 2 March 2015. He also has a career high ATP doubles ranking of 634 achieved on 12 August 2019.

Podžus has represented Latvia at the Davis Cup where he has a W/L record of 0–10.

Podžus has a twin brother Mārtiņš Podžus is also a tennis player.

Future and Challenger finals

Singles: 2 (0–2)

Doubles 10 (6–4)

External links
 
 
 

1994 births
Living people
Latvian male tennis players
People from Bauska
Sportspeople from Riga